The Love Collection is the first compilation album released by Hong Kong female singer, Jinny Ng. It was released on 27 November 2014 along with 4 different postcards.

Track listing

Record sales charts

Awards and nominations

IFPI Hong Kong Sales Awards

References 

Jinny Ng albums
2014 compilation albums
Cantopop compilation albums